Andrea Pellegrino (born 23 March 1997) is an Italian tennis player.
He has a career high ATP singles ranking of world No. 136 achieved on 26 September 2022. He also has a career high doubles ranking of world No. 165 achieved on 13 January 2020. Pellegrino has won one doubles ATP title at the 2023 Chile Open and two singles and five doubles ATP Challenger titles.

ATP career finals

Doubles: 1 (1 title)

Challenger and Futures finals

Singles: 12 (7–5)

Doubles: 14 (9–5)

References

External links
 
 
 

1997 births
Living people
Italian male tennis players
21st-century Italian people